The 2018 European Beach Volleyball Championship was held from the 15th until the 22nd of July, 2018 in Apeldoorn, Rotterdam, The Hague, and Utrecht in The Netherlands. The draw consisted of 32 men's & 32 women's teams, with  20,000 EUR prize money per gender.

Men's tournament

Preliminary round

Pool A

|}

|}

Pool B

|}

|}

Pool C

|}

|}

Pool D

|}

|}

Pool E

|}

|}

Pool F

|}

|}

Pool G

|}

|}

Pool H

|}

|}

Knockout stage
A draw will be held to determine the pairings.

Round of 24

|}

Round of 16

|}

Quarterfinals

|}

Semifinals

|}

Third place game

|}

Final

|}

Women's tournament

Preliminary round

Pool A

|}

|}

Pool B

|}

|}

Pool C

|}

|}

Pool D

|}

|}

Pool E

|}

|}

Pool F

|}

|}

Pool G

|}

|}

Pool H

|}

|}

Knockout stage
A draw will be held to determine the pairings.

Round of 24

|}

Round of 16

|}

Quarterfinals

|}

Semifinals

|}

Third place game

|}

Final

|}

References

External links
Men's tournament – Results
Women's tournament – Results

European Beach Volleyball Championships
European Beach Volleyball
European Beach Volleyball
European Beach Volleyball Championships
International volleyball competitions hosted by the Netherlands
Sports competitions in Apeldoorn
Sports competitions in The Hague
Sports competitions in Rotterdam
Beach volleyball in the Netherlands